Fahad Essam (born 9 June 1988) is a Saudi football player who plays for Al-Ula as a winger.

References

Honours
Al-Fateh SC
Saudi Professional League: 2012–13
Saudi Super Cup: 2013

1988 births
Living people
Saudi Arabian footballers
Al-Shabab FC (Riyadh) players
Al-Hamadah Club players
Al-Fateh SC players
Al-Diriyah Club players
Al-Shoulla FC players
Al-Hazem F.C. players
Sajer Club players
Al-Ula FC players
Saudi First Division League players
Saudi Professional League players
Saudi Second Division players
Saudi Third Division players
Saudi Fourth Division players
Association football midfielders